The Château Saint-Jeannet is a notable French château located in the Côte d'Azur, about  northwest of the city of Nice.

Nomenclature
Prior to major renovations completed in 2009, it was known as the Château de la Gaude, because it is situated in the village of La Gaude, just south of Saint-Jeannet proper. 
The castle was only re-built after 2 years of research into the original state of the chateau before it was destroyed. - The chateau has been built to
its original status except that it has been made more liveable to rent out in order to maintain and look after the chateau which is an important part of the 
village of st jeannet.

History
Tradition holds that the site was used as a Templar fortress as early the 9th and 10th centuries. 
However, the earliest known construction on the château hill can only be dated to the 11th century. 
Written records of a château on the site date to the 13th century. Since that time, it has been effectively destroyed and rebuilt several times.
The most recent renovation recovered evidence of the design of that earliest fort, and has attempted to echo it in the placement of the road, outer walls, and observatory tower.

In 2011, the owner of the castle was convicted of a breach of the urban planning code after erecting approximately 900 illegal square meters.
This condemnation amounted to several hundred thousand euros and the restoration of the premises.
In 2017, after numerous actions of the local residents who demanded that the judicial condamnation be applied, the French state engaged the work of demolitions that will start in June 2017.
Local news paper article

The chateau named by the owner "chateau de saint jeannet" is still administratively called "chateau de la gaude".

A book has been printed on the subject of the château's history, and it goes into much greater detail, but does not describe the judicial debts of the actual castle owner.

References

External links
 Official website

Châteaux in Alpes-Maritimes